The Khamronsin-class corvettes are three corvettes constructed for the Royal Thai Navy in the late 1980s. Based on a British design, all three ships were built in Thailand. A fourth vessel, constructed to a modified design, was built for the Thai Police and was the first to enter service in 1992. The three Khamrosin-class corvettes commissioned in 1992 and remain in service.

Design and description
The three Khamronsin-class corvettes are based on the British Vosper Thornycroft Province design that was the basis for the Omani  with increased spacing between the frames, increasing the length of the vessels. The corvettes have a complement of 6 officers and 51 enlisted.

The class is equipped with Plessey Nautis P combat data system and the British Aerospace Sea Archer 1A Mod 2 optronic gun control fire system (GCFS). They mount the Plessey AWS 4 air/surface search radar and the Atlas Elektronik DSQS-21C hull-mounted sonar. The Khamronsin class is armed with one OTO Melara /62 Mod 7 gun mounted forward and twin-mounted Breda /70 guns atop the aft superstructure. The corvettes also mount two triple Plessey PMW49A torpedo tubes for Sting Ray torpedoes and two  machine guns. A Mk.6 depth charge launcher and naval mines can also be installed aboard the ships.

Srinakarin sub class
A fourth unit was designed and constructed for the police. This vessel, Srinakarin, shares the same displacement and measurements as the Khamronsin class. The ship has the same speed and range as the Khamronsin class, but has a smaller complement with only 45 crew members. Srinakarin is armed with two twin-mounted 30 mm guns and has Racal Decca 1226 surface search radar.

Units

Construction and career
The first two Royal Thai Navy corvettes were ordered on 29 September 1987 from Ital Thai Marine at their yard in Bangkok, Thailand with aid to construct a third at the Bangkok Naval Dockyard. The first two vessels were laid down on 15 March 1988, one in each yard. The third ship was laid down at Ital Thai Marine's yard on 20 April. Longlom was launched on 8 August 1989 and Kamronsin on 15 August. Srinakarin, the fourth vessel, was ordered by the police in September 1989 from the Ital Thai Marine yard. The vessel's yard number was 82. Srinakarin was the first to enter service in April 1992. Kamronsin was the first naval version to commission on 29 July 1992, followed by Thayanchon on 5 September and Longlom on 2 October. All four ships are in service.

Notes

Citations

References
 
 

Corvette classes
Ships of the Royal Thai Navy
Corvettes of Thailand